The Kaldenkirchen Sequoia Farm is a German arboretum that has been used as a biological institute for many years. Part of the protected area in the city of Nettetal, it is situated in the "Kaldenkirchen Grenzwald" (forest bordering Germany and the Netherlands). Nettetal lies in the Lower Rhine region of Germany.

History and use 
In 1946, Illa Martin and Ernst J. Martin, both dentists and dendrologists in Kaldenkirchen, founded an arboretum close to the Dutch border. There, and in a nearby laboratory-plantation several acres wide from 1952 on, they cultivated 1,500 giant sequoia (Sequoiadendron giganteum) seedlings from seeds of US origin from Martin's nephew Albert A. Martin of Santa Barbara, CA. The seeds were collected in Sequoia National Forest at different elevations, wrapped in burlap to preserve them and sent to Germany. They wanted to find out if the giant sequoia, which had existed in Germany before the ice age, could be introduced to German forestry. There was on the one hand an area of purely giant sequoia, on the other an experimental arboretum with trees such as Abies grandis, Abies concolor var. lowiana and Coast Douglas-firs. The project was financially supported by the German Research Foundation and met with great interest from dendrological circles, particularly in Great Britain and in the USA. Part of the field exclusively planted with giant sequoia was reserved for obtaining results of productivity by the "Ecology and Forestry Department" of North Rhine-Westphalia (NRW). 

The two dendrologists made further experiments growing seedlings of coast redwood, dawn redwood and numerous kinds of southern beeches and pine trees. More than 13,000 were handed over to forestry officers, to scientists and to plant nurseries. As time went by, the park known as the "Sequoia Farm" became bigger and bigger, developing into a highly respected arboretum. It has more than 400 varieties of trees and interesting ground flora and is part of the "Protected area of Maas-Schwalm-Nette", so-called after the three rivers that run through the area.

After the death of Ernst J. Martin in 1967, North Rhine-Westphalia (NRW) took over the farm. At first, the teacher-training institute of NRW, later on the University of Cologne, and, between 1987 and 2007, the University of Duisburg-Essen made it a centre of dendrological studies. Since 2013 the arboretum has been in possession of the registered society "Sequoiafarm e.V.". From April to October it is open to the public on Sundays and holidays.

Notable trees (selection)

References 
 Ernst J. Martin: Mammutbäume in der deutschen Forstwirtschaft? In: Die Umschau in Wissenschaft und Technik. Frankfurt 1954, 
 Ernst J. Martin: Sequoia – eine gehölzkundliche Betrachtung. In: Holz-Zentralblatt No. 83. Stuttgart 1955, 
 Ernst J. Martin: Die Sequoien und ihre Anzucht. In: Jahrbuch der Deutschen Dendrologischen Gesellschaft. No. 60. 1957/1958
 Herbert Hubatsch: Von der Sequoiafarm zur Biologischen Station. In: Heimatbuch des Kreises Kempen-Krefeld, Kempen 1973
 Helge Breloer: Zur Erinnerung an die Sequoia-Farm in Kaldenkirchen. In: Baum-Zeitung. No. 1/1998, 
 Ado Lappen: Die Sequoiafarm in Nettetal-Kaldenkirchen. In: Beiträge zur Gehölzkunde 2011. Hemmingen 2011,

Notes

External links 

 Photographs. History of the Arboretum Sequoiafarm (German)
 Sequioafarm Kaldenkirchen in "Projekt Mammutbaum" (German)
 Ernst J. Martin in "Projekt Mammutbaum“ (German)
 List of stocks of the woody plants

Arboreta in Germany
Dendrology
Education in North Rhine-Westphalia
Forestry in Germany
Sequoioideae
1950 establishments in West Germany